Vladimir Ostarčević (born 22 April 1982) is a Croatian handballer, who played as a centre back in HRK Karlovac. 

Ostarčević played for Croatia U-21 team at the IHF Men's Junior World Championship in 2003. He made 30 appearances for Croatia and played at the 2005 Mediterranean Games where they won a silver medal.  

He has played for clubs from Croatia, Slovenia, Spain and France.

Honours
RK Zagreb
Croatian First League (1): 2001-02

References

External links
European Competition
Premier League statistics
RK Zamet profile
Handball-world-news
France First Division stats

1982 births
Living people
Croatian male handball players
Sportspeople from Karlovac
RK Zamet players
RK Zagreb players
Croatian expatriate sportspeople in France
Croatian expatriate sportspeople in Slovenia
Croatian expatriate sportspeople in Spain
Mediterranean Games silver medalists for Croatia
Mediterranean Games medalists in handball
Competitors at the 2005 Mediterranean Games